Liaoning Zhongba (Sino-Brazilian) (Simplified Chinese: 辽宁中巴) was a Chinese football club its based in Liaoning, China.

External links
 http://www.ccbfc.com/
 http://www.saopaulofc.net

Defunct football clubs in China
Football clubs in China
Football clubs in Liaoning